Magyigon is the name of several places in Burma:

Magyigon (24°'44"N 95°40"E) -Banmauk Township
Magyigon (24°'41"N 95°44"E) -Banmauk Township
Magyigon (24°21"N 95°24"E) -Banmauk Township
Magyigon (24°16"N 95°51"E) -Banmauk Township